In probability theory Wald's martingale, named after Abraham Wald and more commonly
known as the geometric Brownian motion, is a stochastic process of the form

 

for any real value λ where Wt is a Wiener process. The process is a martingale.

See also

Wald's equation

Notes

Martingale theory